Dangerous Business may refer to:
 Dangerous Business (1946 film), an American comedy drama film
 Dangerous Business (1920 film), an American silent comedy film